Nathaniel Greene  is an 1870 marble statue of Nathanael Greene by Henry Kirke Brown, installed in the United States Capitol, in Washington, D.C., as part of the National Statuary Hall Collection. It is one of two statues donated by the state of Rhode Island.  The statue portrays Greene dressed in the uniform of a Revolutionary War general, holding a sword in his left hand.

Brown later (1877) created an equestrian statue of Greene, also located in Washington, D.C.

See also
 1870 in art

References

External links
 

1870 establishments in Washington, D.C.
1870 sculptures
Sculptures by Henry Kirke Brown
Marble sculptures in Washington, D.C.
Monuments and memorials in Washington, D.C.
Greene, Nathaniel
Sculptures of men in Washington, D.C.